Euaugaptilus hyperboreus is a species of deep-water copepod.

References

Calanoida
Crustaceans described in 1950